This is an incomplete list of past and present Members of Parliament (MPs) of the United Kingdom whose surnames begin with H.  The dates in parentheses are the periods for which they were MPs. 
George Hadfield
William Hague
Peter Hain
Louise Haigh
John Halcomb
Richard Burdon Haldane, 1st Viscount Haldane
Charles Montagu, 1st Earl of Halifax
Leslie Hale, Baron Hale
Glenvil Hall
 Sir John Hall (1952–1978)
 John Hall (1950–1955)
Mike Hall
Patrick Hall
Angus Valdemar Hambro (1910,–1922,1937,–1945)
Archie Hamilton
Sir David Hamilton
Fabian Hamilton
James Hamilton, 5th Duke of Abercorn
Neil Hamilton
Paulette Hamilton
Willie Hamilton
Philip Hammond
Stephen Hammond
Sir John Pakington, 1st Baron Hampton
Matthew Hancock
Mike Hancock
Greg Hands
Sir Jeremy Hanley
Sir David Hanson
Lewis Vernon Harcourt, 1st Viscount Harcourt
Keir Hardie
Harriet Harman
Mark Harper
Evan Harris
Fred Harris
John Dove Harris
Richard Harris
Tom Harris
Brian Harrison
Sir Harwood Harrison
James Harrison
David Hartley
Ian Harvey
John Harvey
Sir Nick Harvey
Sir George Harvie-Watt
Alan Haselhurst
Sir Arthur Haselrig
Sir Patrick Hastings
Somerville Hastings
Edward John Littleton, 1st Baron Hatherton
Roy Hattersley
Sir Christopher Hatton
Dai Havard
Michael Havers, Baron Havers
Thomas Hawkes (1834-1844)
Nick Hawkins
John Hayes
Helene Hayman
Helen Hayes
Walter Hazell
Anthony Head, 1st Viscount Head
Sylvia Heal
Oliver Heald
Cahir Healy
Denis Healey
John Healey
David Heath
Edward Heath
David Heathcoat-Amory
Derick Heathcoat-Amory, 1st Viscount Amory
John Hemming
Arthur Henderson
Doug Henderson
Douglas Henderson
Ivan Henderson
Mark Hendrick
Charles Hendry
J. W. Henley
Stephen Hepburn
John Heppell
A. P. Herbert
Sidney Herbert, 1st Baron Herbert of Lea
Aubrey Herbert
Nick Herbert
Sidney Herbert, 14th Earl of Pembroke
Margaret Herbison
Sylvia Hermon 
Michael Heseltine
Stephen Hesford
Gordon Hewart, 1st Viscount Hewart
Patricia Hewitt
David Heyes
William Unwin Heygate
Benjamin Heywood
Terence Higgins, Baron Higgins
Archibald Hill
Keith Hill
Meg Hillier
David Hinchliffe
Mark Hoban
John Hobhouse, 1st Baron Broughton
Margaret Hodge
Sharon Hodgson
Kate Hoey
Douglas Hogg, 3rd Viscount Hailsham
Quintin Hogg, Baron Hailsham of St Marylebone
John Holker
Henry Holland, 1st Viscount Knutsford
Stuart Holland
Philip Hollobone
Adam Holloway
Percy Holman
Paul Holmes (2001–2010)
Paul Holmes (2019–)
John Home Robertson
Jimmy Hood
Geoff Hoon
Phil Hope
Kelvin Hopkins
John Horam
Leslie Hore-Belisha, 1st Baron Hore-Belisha
Frank Hornby
Robert Stevenson Horne, 1st Viscount Horne
Frederick John Horniman
Martin Horwood
Stewart Hosie
John Howard (1955–1964)
Michael Howard
Alan Howarth
David Howarth
George Howarth
Gerald Howarth
Geoffrey Howe
David Howell
Geraint Howells
Kim Howells
Lindsay Hoyle
Robert Hudson, 1st Viscount Hudson
Beverley Hughes
Cledwyn Hughes
Kevin Hughes
Robert Hughes, Baron Hughes of Woodside
Robert Gurth Hughes
Simon Hughes
Thomas Hughes
John Hughes-Hallett
Chris Huhne
Joan Humble
John Hume
David Hunt
George Ward Hunt
Jeremy Hunt
Mark Hunter
Anthony Hurd
Douglas Hurd
Nick Hurd
Alan Hurst
John Hutton
Harry Hylton-Foster

 H